Homicidal Lifestyle is an album by the American rapper Gangsta Pat, released in 1997.

The album peaked at No. 68 on Billboard's Top R&B Albums chart.

Critical reception
AllMusic wrote that the album "has a couple of good grooves and rhymes scattered throughout the album, but it's hard to take any record whose highlight is a by-the-books party number called 'I Wanna Smoke' all that seriously."

Track listing 
 "Instructions" – 1:04
 "I Wanna Smoke" [Remix] – 4:47
 "Creep Wit a Nigga" (featuring Lil' Tec) – 3:50
 "Killa" (skit) – 1:02
 "Empty tha Clip" – 4:49
 "How Deep Is Yo Luv" (featuring Hollo Point) – 5:57
 "Boddies on My 9" – 4:47
 "Dead Presidents" – 4:29
 "Blunted up (Skit)" – 2:02
 "Homicidal Lifestyle" – 4:35
 "Lay Me Down" (featuring Lil' Tec) – 4:39
 "Deadly Verses '97" (featuring Villain) – 3:36
 "I Wanna Smoke" (featuring Psycho) – 5:09
 "Murdur" – 3:38

References

1997 albums
Gangsta Pat albums